The Central Assurance Company is a historic building in Columbus, Ohio. It was built in 1942 and listed as part of the E. Broad St. Multiple Resources Area on the National Register of Historic Places in 1986. It is significant for its Art Deco architecture, one of few remaining commercial buildings in the style in Columbus.

See also
 National Register of Historic Places listings in Columbus, Ohio

References

Commercial buildings completed in 1942
Commercial buildings on the National Register of Historic Places in Ohio
1942 establishments in Ohio
National Register of Historic Places in Columbus, Ohio
Olde Towne East
Broad Street (Columbus, Ohio)